is a railway station on the Kansai Main Line (Yamatoji Line) of West Japan Railway Company (JR West) in Yamato-Kōriyama, Nara Prefecture, Japan.

Layout
There are 2 side platforms serving 2 tracks on the ground level, and ticket gates are located over the platforms and tracks.

History 
Station numbering was introduced in March 2018 with Koriyama being assigned station number JR-Q34.

Adjacent stations

References 

Railway stations in Japan opened in 1890
Railway stations in Nara Prefecture